Viktor Baldayev (born June 14, 1995) is a Russian professional ice hockey defenceman. He is currently playing with Amur Khabarovsk of the Kontinental Hockey League (KHL)

Baldayev made his KHL debut playing with Atlant Moscow Oblast during the 2014–15 KHL season. He played two seasons of major junior hockey in the CHL with the Rouyn-Noranda Huskies and Chicoutimi Saguenéens of the Quebec Major Junior Hockey League (QMJHL).

References

External links

1995 births
Living people
Amur Khabarovsk players
Atlant Moscow Oblast players
Chicoutimi Saguenéens (QMJHL) players
HC Karlovy Vary players
HC Kunlun Red Star players
Metallurg Novokuznetsk players
Rouyn-Noranda Huskies players
Russian ice hockey defencemen
HC Sochi players
HC Spartak Moscow players
Severstal Cherepovets players
Torpedo Nizhny Novgorod players
People from Elektrostal
Sportspeople from Moscow Oblast
Russian expatriate sportspeople in China
Russian expatriate sportspeople in the Czech Republic
Russian expatriate sportspeople in Canada
Expatriate ice hockey players in the Czech Republic
Expatriate ice hockey players in Canada
Expatriate ice hockey players in China